Monroe Township is one of the twenty-seven townships of Ashtabula County, Ohio, United States. The 2010 census found 2,381 people in the township.

Geography
Located on the northeastern edge of the county, it borders the following townships and city:
Conneaut - north
Conneaut Township, Erie County, Pennsylvania - northeast
Beaver Township, Crawford County, Pennsylvania - southeast
Pierpont Township - south
Denmark Township - southwest corner
Sheffield Township - west
Kingsville Township - northwest

No municipalities are located in Monroe Township.

Name and history
It is one of twenty-two Monroe Townships statewide.

The first settler in Monroe Township was Stephen Moulton, who arrived from New York in 1799.

Government
The township is governed by a three-member board of trustees, who are elected in November of odd-numbered years to a four-year term beginning on the following January 1. Two are elected in the year after the presidential election and one is elected in the year before it. There is also an elected township fiscal officer, who serves a four-year term beginning on April 1 of the year after the election, which is held in November of the year before the presidential election. Vacancies in the fiscal officership or on the board of trustees are filled by the remaining trustees.  Currently, the members of the board are John Griggs, Roger Sherman, Jr, and Robert Pixley.

References

External links
Township website
County website

Townships in Ashtabula County, Ohio
Townships in Ohio